The 1998 Sparkassen Cup singles was the tennis singles event of the ninth edition of the Sparkassen Cup; a WTA Tier II tournament held in Leipzig, Germany.

Jana Novotná was the defending champion but chose not to compete this year.

Steffi Graf won the title, defeating Nathalie Tauziat in the final, 6–3, 6–4. This title would be Graf's last in her native Germany before retiring in 1999.

Seeds
The top four seeds received a bye to the second round.

Draw

Finals

Top half

Bottom half

External links
 1998 Sparkassen Cup draw

Sparkassen Cup (tennis)
1998 WTA Tour